Ibtissem Trimèche (born 2 March 1982) is a Tunisian rower. She competed at the 2000 Summer Olympics and the 2004 Summer Olympics.

References

1982 births
Living people
Tunisian female rowers
Olympic rowers of Tunisia
Rowers at the 2000 Summer Olympics
Rowers at the 2004 Summer Olympics
Sportspeople from Tunis
21st-century Tunisian women